The Definitive Rarities Collection – 50 Classic Cuts is a compilation album of songs by Nina Simone, released in 2009.

Track listing
"Compensation" – 4:48
"Please Don't Let Me Be Misunderstood" - 3:52
"Stick Together" – 1:48
"Strange Fruit" – 4:18	
"Medley Moon of Alabama - In Childhoods Bright Endeavor - In My Life - Stick Together" – 10:39
"Revolution"– 6:27
"In My Life" – 2:05
"Born Under a Bad Sign" – 6:01
"I Can't See Nobody" – 6:10
"Who Am I" – 4:31
"I Wish I Knew How It Would Feel to Be Free" – 6:07
"Save Me" (Ousley, A. Franklin, C. Franklin) – 3:06
"I Shall Be Released" – 4:45
"Ain't Got No, I Got Life" – 4:00
"My Baby Just Cares for Me" – 5:31
"I'm on My Way" – 7:10	
"Sinnerman" – 3:06
"Nobody's Fault but Mine" – 3:57
"He's Got the Whole World" – 3:11
"A Mighty Fortress" (instrumental) – 3:11
"The Blood" – 2:48
"Church Jazz" (instrumental) – 7:16
"He's My God" – 1:09
"What A Blessing In Jesus" –  3:47
"Nearer Blessed Lord" –  4:27
"Children Go Where I Send You" –  7:46
"Oh Happy Day" – 8:17
"Revolution" – 4:40
"Mississippi Goddamn" – 4:31
"Old Jim Crow" – 2:19
"Backlash Blues" – 3:07	
"Four Women" – 4:10
"Nobody" – 5:08
"I Wish I Knew How It Would Feel to Be Free" – 4:54
"Definition of an Artist" – 3:04
"Why the King of Love Is Dead" – 9:20
"To Be Young, Gifted and Black" – 3:40
"Strange Fruit" – 3:24
"Fine and Mellow" – 5:05
"Tell Me More" – 3:05
"Love Me or Leave Me" – 4:03
"I Got It Bad and That Ain't Good" – 2:37
"Do Nothing till You Hear from Me" – 2:49
"It Don't Mean a Thing" – 2:18
"You Don't Know What Love Is" – 4:55
"Just In Time" –	 3:55
"Chauffeur" – 2:50
"I Loves You Porgy" – 4:02
"I Love To Love" – 4:36
"Wild Is The Wind" – 5:45

References

2009 compilation albums
Nina Simone compilation albums